Sagat: The Documentary stylized as SAGAT: The Documentary, SAGAT - Uncut or just SAGAT (in French Sagat: le documentaire) is a 2011 documentary on pornographic actor and gay icon François Sagat about his persona and impact on world culture directed by Pascal Roche and Jérôme M. De Oliveira. It was produced by ADL TV and after an idea by Brenda & Lucy Co.

Screenings
It premiered on the French Canal+ station on 1 March 2011. The United States premiere was at the Museum of Arts and Design in New York on 18 November 2011. It also showed at a number of gay film festivals and documentary film festivals.

Synopsis
The 60-minutes documentary follows Sagat's working career with a rare behind-the-scenes glimpse into the cult actor's performances, and gives plenty of testimonials about Sagat's impact. Most of the shooting was done in Cognac, Paris and San Francisco. The film contains many quotations from other notables from the industry including Chi Chi LaRue who compares Sagat with the pop diva Madonna, and filmmaker Bruce LaBruce who calls Sagat "the Marilyn Monroe of gay porn -- Marilyn had her breasts, François has the ass".

In this uncensored docu-portrait, the pornstar is engaged with a mixture of candor and quite touching fragility. And is not afraid to talk about his fears or cracks. An endearing look at a gay icon like no other. Very notably, he declares towards the end of the documentary: "Je pense que je vais arrêter le porno" (meaning I think I'll stop doing porno films).

Reception
The documentary received very positive reviews including one from the French gay magazine Têtu who interviewed him. The magazine also wrote in its review: "This film is sexy and moving, the sex icon presents itself extremely sensitive and profound".

References

2011 television films
2011 films
2011 documentary films
Documentary films about gay male pornography
French LGBT-related films
2011 LGBT-related films
2010s French films